Mulgeum station is a railway station on the Gyeongbu Line located in Mulgeum-ri, Mulgeum-eup, Yangsan-si, Gyeongsangnam-do, Korea. It is the starting point of the Yangsan Line.

Mugunghwa-ho and ITX-Saemaeul stops on 40 one-way trips, 20 up and 20 down, each day.

History 
1905. 1. 1. Open business at normal station

1939. 6. 1. the completion of a new history

1968. 12. 30. Completion of cargo warehouse

1971. 3. 2. the installation of a cargo ship

1997. 10. 1. Suspend the handling of the parcels (Railway Administration Notice No. 1997-51)

1999. 1. 1. Stop handling parcels (Railway Public Notice No. 1998-72)

2003. 9. 23. the completion of a new history

2006. 5. 10. Opening of a mass-oxidized ship (between Mulgeum Station and Yangsan Station)

2009. 10. 31. Stop cargo handling (National Land, Maritime Affairs and Fisheries Notice 2009-1006)

Location 
Mulgeum-ri 372–3 in Mulgeum-eup, Yangsan-si, Gyeongsangnam-do

Station periphery 

Hwangshan Park
Obongsan Imgyeongdae
 Yangwu Naeanae Apartment 5th
 Mulgeum-eup Office

References

Railway stations in South Gyeongsang Province